The Last Vegas are an American hard rock band from Chicago whose style draws from glam, punk, and sleaze metal. Composed of Chad Cherry (lead vocals), John Wator (guitar), Adam Arling (guitar), Danny Smash (bass), and Nate Arling (drums), the band released the album Whatever Gets You Off, in April 2009, on Eleven Seven Music. The album was produced by Nikki Sixx, Sixx:A.M. guitarist DJ Ashba, as well as Marti Frederiksen.

Sound 
The Last Vegas are a hard rock band with influences from genres including glam rock, heavy metal, and punk rock, citing influences such as Aerosmith, Guns N' Roses, Mötley Crüe, Cheap Trick, and Skid Row. They have performed all over the world since 2003.

History 
The Last Vegas made their recording debut with the full-length album Lick 'Em and Leave 'Em (2004) on the independent label Get Hip Records. A second full-length album, Seal the Deal (2006), followed on the same label.

After leaving Get Hip, the Last Vegas released a five-track EP High Class Trash (2007), spotlighting the song "Raw Dog", which was featured in the popular video game Guitar Hero II (2006). The full-length, The Last Vegas (2008), showcased the band growth with new singer Cherry and bassist Smash. In December 2008 the Last Vegas won Guitar Center's On-Stage: Your Chance to Make Rock History contest opening for Mötley Crüe. They also won $25,000 cash, $20,000 in new gear from Gibson Guitars, a management deal from 10th Street Entertainment and a recording deal from Eleven Seven Music. They beat out 8,000 contestants for the coveted prize.

In 2008, The band was also picked as Spin magazine's "Best New Discovery" at SXSW 2008.

The Last Vegas joined Mötley Crüe on their US winter Saints Of Los Angeles Tour, along with Theory of a Deadman and Hinder. The band released its fourth full-length album and first major label album Whatever Gets You Off, the album was released to mainly positive reviews, produced by Mötley Crüe's Nikki Sixx, Sixx:A.M.'s DJ Ashba and frequent collaborator Marti Frederiksen, although most of the material on the album consists of the band's self-released self-titled album from 2008. The first single from the album was "I'm Bad".

With the release of the major label debut, the band toured with many bands, including Mötley Crüe, AC/DC, Guns N' Roses, Buckcherry, Papa Roach and landed headlining concerts in over 17 countries worldwide, currently touring to promote their latest album.

Discography 
2004 – Lick 'Em and Leave 'Em
2005 – Seal the Deal
2008 – The Last Vegas
2009 – Whatever Gets You Off
2012 – Bad Decisions
2014 – Sweet Salvation
2016 – Eat Me

Music videos 
"Hot Leather"
"All the Way"
"So Young, So Pretty, So What"
"Ain't A Good Man"
"Loose Lips"
"I'm Bad"
"Whatever Gets You Off"
"Apologize"
"The Other Side"
"Evil Eyes"
"She's My Confusion"
"Come With Me"
"You and Me"
"Miss You"
"Bloodthirsty"

References

External links 
Official Website
Rolling Stone
Chad Cherry Interview on Sleaze Roxx
The Second Supper interview with Chad Cherry
The Last Vegas Forum
Fans site on The Last Vegas
Escapistmagazine.com
Videogamesblogger.com
Glam-metal.com

Glam metal musical groups from Illinois
Hard rock musical groups from Illinois
Musical groups from Chicago